The Hôtel de Ville is the town hall of Liège in Belgium, located on place du Marché. It was built in 1714. It is also known as La Violette.

Sources
http://perso.infonie.be/liege06/07sept1.htm 
http://users.belgacom.net/cwarzee/place_du_marche/index.htm 

Liège
Buildings and structures in Liège